Gubernatorial elections were held in Brazil on 7 October 2018 as part of the nationwide general elections to elect tickets with state governors and their vice governors (as well as the Governor of the Federal District and their vice governor). A second round was held on 28 October.

Results
The Governors elected in 2018 were the following:

References

2018
2018 elections in Brazil